The 2019 Group 10 Rugby League season was the 73rd season of the premier rugby league competition in the Central West area of New South Wales. It was run under the auspices of the Country Rugby League. It was the seventh consecutive season to feature nine teams, after the re-admittance of the Blayney Bears in 2013.

Bathurst Panthers entered the season as defending champions, after defeating Cowra Magpies 12–10 in the 2018 Premier League decider. Panthers five-eighth and goal kicker Willie Wright kicked a match-winning conversion with four minutes remaining in the decider played at Cowra's Sid Kallas Oval, sealing Panthers first Premier League title since 2007.

Panthers would defend its title with a 9–8 win over Mudgee Dragons in the grand final at Carrington Park that went to extra-time.

Off-season signings

Premier League season summary

Eighteen rounds was played between March to August, which concluded with a finals played under the top five McIntyre system. Bathurst Panthers played its round one match against Blayney Bears on March 30 at Carrington Park. The match acted as a curtain raiser to NRL match between the Penrith Panthers and Melbourne Storm later that evening. The remainder of the first round of Group 10 Premier League was played on weekend beginning on April 13.

Orange Hawks claimed the minor premiership, but were bundled out in straight sets to be the first minor premier to miss the grand final since 1998, which ironically was the Orange Hawks. The grand final was played between the Bathurst Panthers and Mudgee Dragons. The match went to extra-time after the match finished 8–all after 80 minutes. Panthers captain-coach Doug Hewitt would kick a field goal in extra-time to give his side a 9–8 lead, which would prove enough for Panthers to claim a second consecutive premiership and its fourth overall.

Teams

Group 10 Premier League ladder

Updated to match(es) played on unknown. Source: Rules for classification: 1) points; 2) point difference; 3) number of points scored.

Group 10 Premier League results

 Results and scorers courtesy of Group 10 Rugby League.
 Match reports courtesy of Blayney Chronicle, Central Western Daily, Cowra Guardian, Lithgow Mercury, Mudgee Guardian, Oberon Review and Western Advocate.

Round 1

 The Bathurst Panthers versus Blayney Bears acted as a curtain-raiser to the round three National Rugby League match between Penrith Panthers and Melbourne Storm.
 Oberon Tigers had the bye.

Round 2

 Orange CYMS had the bye.

Round 3

 Mudgee Dragons scored more than 60 points in a game for the first time since round 16, 2017, when they defeated Blayney Bears 64−0.
 Orange Hawks had the bye.

Round 4

 Bathurst St Patrick's had the bye.

Round 5

 Blayney Bears had the bye.

Round 6

 Mudgee Dragons had the bye.
 Lithgow Workies claimed back-to-back wins for the first time since round 18 in 2017.

Round 7

 Orange CYMS had the bye.

Round 8

 Lithgow Workmen's Club had the bye.

Round 9

 Cowra Magpies had the bye.

Round 10

 Bathurst Panthers had the bye.

Round 11

 Orange Hawks had the bye.

Round 12

 Bathurst St Patrick's had the bye.

Round 13

 Blayney Bears had the bye.

Round 14

 Mudgee Dragons had the bye.

Round 15

 Orange CYMS had the bye.

Round 16

 Oberon Tigers had the bye.

Round 17

 Lithgow Workmen's Club had the bye.
 The Oberon Tigers versus Blayney Bears and the Orange CYMS versus Mudgee Dragons were postponed after snow closed roads across the Group 10 region. With the result of the games making no difference to the competition ladder, they were not rescheduled.

Round 18

 Cowra Magpies had the bye.

Group 10 Premier League finals series

Elimination final/Qualifying final

Semi-finals

Preliminary final

Grand final

Grand final report

Bathurst Panthers hosted the Group 10 Rugby League grand final day for the first time since 2007. Mudgee Dragons had won all their grand finals against Panthers (in 2000 and 2004) at Carrington Park.

The match was a low-scoring affair and it wasn't until the Dragons gave away two straight penalties that Panthers broke the deadlock with a penalty goal from the boot of Willie Wright in the 18th minute to give the Bathurst side a 2–nil lead.

Neither team could build momentum as both sides continued to shoot themselves in the foot through handling errors or discipline issues, but the Dragons crowd came to life with two minutes remaining in the half, voicing their approval of a huge break down the middle from Ben Thompson. Nathan Orr made the most of the chance close to the line, fending off an opponent before planting down the ball for the only try of the opening half. Mudgee lead 4–2 at half-time.

After play resumed for the second-half, Panthers looked to their left wing for a response eight minutes into the new half, however, Louis Murphy was denied on the try line by desperate Dragons defence.

Another Orr fend gave the Dragons centre a chance to score in the 57th minute but a strong tackle from Josh Rivett put him into touch.

However, Jack Beasley wasn't going to be denied five minutes later and the Mudgee substitute crashed over to give the Dragons a 8–2 lead.

It was on the 67th minute mark that the Panthers found their opening try of the match as second rower Jack Siejka scored between the uprights.

Wright's conversion brought the score level at 8–all and with no team finding the winning points in the remaining minutes, the match went to extra-time, the first grand final to require extra-time since 2006.

Extra-time would be five minutes each way and in their first chance to break the deadlock, captain-coach Doug Hewitt slotted home a field goal.

The Panthers held on to win their second consecutive Group 10 Rugby League Premier League title.

Bathurst Panthers 9 (Jack Siejka try; Willie Wright 2 goals, Doug Hewitt field goal)

Mudgee Dragons 8 (Nathan Orr, Jack Beasley tries)

References

External links
Group 10 ladder - from Sporting Pulse
Group 10 on Country Rugby League's official site

2019 in Australian rugby league
Rugby league competitions in New South Wales